Alessandro Frosini (born 22 September 1972) is an Italian former professional basketball player. He was also a member of the Italian national basketball team.  He has won the EuroLeague twice in 1997–98 and 2000–01, along with Virtus Bologna.

He is now a sports director for Grissin Bon Reggio Emilia.

References

1972 births
Living people
1998 FIBA World Championship players
Fortitudo Pallacanestro Bologna players
Italian men's basketball players
Juvecaserta Basket players
Lega Basket Serie A players
Pallacanestro Biella players
Pallacanestro Reggiana players
Scaligera Basket Verona players
Sportspeople from Siena
Victoria Libertas Pallacanestro players
Virtus Bologna players
Centers (basketball)